Michelangelo Fumagalli (April 14, 1812 – January 25, 1886) was an Italian painter born in Milan.

From 1832 to 1836, he was a pupil of Luigi Sabatelli at the Brera Academy. His father, Ignazio, was an engraver and sculptor in Milan, and had been Secretary of the Academy of Fine Arts in Milan. Fumagalli painted history and religious paintings as well as portraits. One of his contemporaries at the Brera was Domenico Induno. He died in Milan.

Notes
Portrait of Giovanni Clerici

Sources
Fumagalli , Michelangelo entry, by Dario Melani in Dizionario Biografico degli Italiani - Volume 50 (1998)

1812 births
1886 deaths
19th-century Italian painters
19th-century Italian male artists
Italian male painters
Italian neoclassical painters
Painters from Milan
Brera Academy alumni